Georgendorf may refer to the following locations:

 Český Jiřetín, a village in the Czech Republic
 Juršinci, a village in Slovenia